Gwened, Bro-Gwened (Standard ) or Vannetais is a historic realm and county of Brittany in France. It is considered part of Lower Brittany.

Bro-Gwened was an early medieval principality or kingdom around Vannes in Armorica (Brittany), lasting from around AD 490 to around 635. It was peopled by Christianized Britons fleeing the Saxon invasions of Britain, who displaced or assimilated the remaining pagan Veneti Gauls. Its bishop and (usually) court was at Gwened, the site of the former Roman settlement of Darioritum and the present French city of Vannes.

Today its territories are included within the modern French department of Morbihan.

Name
The Breton placename-element  initially meant a tribe, but came to signify its territory as well. The standard Breton form of the name mutates Gwened, the Breton name for Vannes, while the local dialect leaves it unchanged as "Bro-Gwened". The modern French name derives from adjectival form of Vannes. Both  and  reflect separate developments of the Latin , the Romans' name for the Gaulish tribe in the area. (It is unrelated to the Welsh realm and county of Gwynedd, which developed from Latin .)

The historic realm was also known as Bro Erec ("land of Gwereg") or Bro Waroch (from the gallicisation of the same name) or by numerous variant spellings, although it is unclear whether the namesake Gwereg was Waroch I or II.

History
The land was allegedly founded by Caradog Strongarm. In the early 6th century, Macliau served as one of the earliest bishops of Vannes prior to usurping his nephew's inheritance in neighboring Cornouaille. He may have also been king of Broerec or simply the refugee guest of Conmor. Major settlements at this time included Gwened (Vannes) and Lokmaria (Locmaria). In the mid-7th century, Bro Gwened was united with Domnonia under its king Saint Judicaël, who was descended from a daughter of Waroch. Domnonia's rulers thenceforth reigned as the high kings of Brittany, with Bro Gwened forming part of their lands.

Dialect

It is distinct from that of the other regions of Brittany to the point of near unintelligibility. Welsh heddiw [hɛðɪu̯])). The dialect also has a tendency to close vowels, places stress on the final syllables of words (as in French and Middle Breton), rather than on the penultimate syllable (as in other Breton dialects and Welsh), and (like English) has completely lost its original 2nd person singular pronoun.

Tartan
As a historic Breton county, Bro-Wened is registered as an official tartan with the British government.

See also
 Domnonia (Domnonée)
 Leon (Léon)
 Cornouaille

References

States and territories established in the 490s
States and territories disestablished in the 7th century
Geography of Brittany
Medieval Brittany
Barbarian kingdoms
History of Morbihan